Nicolas Mungai (born 4 July 1993) is an Italian judoka.

He is the silver medallist of the 2021 Judo Grand Slam Tbilisi and competed for Italy at the 2020 Summer Olympics.

References

External links
 
 

1993 births
Living people
Italian male judoka
Judoka at the 2019 European Games
Judoka at the 2020 Summer Olympics
Olympic judoka of Italy
20th-century Italian people
21st-century Italian people